Thysanoptyx is a genus of moths in the subfamily Arctiinae. The genus was erected by George Hampson in 1894.

Species
Thysanoptyx incurvata (Wileman & West, 1928)
Thysanoptyx oblonga (Butler, 1877)
Thysanoptyx sordida (Butler, 1881)
Thysanoptyx tetragona (Walker, 1854)

References

Lithosiina